Stephen Humble (born 3 January 1977) is an English cricketer.  Humble is a right-handed batsman who bowls right-arm medium pace.  He was born at Hexham, Northumberland.

Humble made his debut in List A cricket for the Durham Cricket Board, playing 2 matches for the team against Hertfordshire in the 2001 Cheltenham & Gloucester Trophy and Herefordshire in 2nd round of the 2003 Cheltenham & Gloucester Trophy which was held in 2002.

Humble joined Northumberland in 2003, making his debut for the county in the Minor Counties Championship against Staffordshire.  From 2003 to 2006, he represented the county in 14 Championship matches, the last of which came against Cumberland.  Humble also represented the county in the MCCA Knockout Trophy.  His debut Trophy match for the county came against Lincolnshire in 2003.  From 2003 to 2008, he represented the county in 12 Trophy matches, the last of which came against Suffolk.  He also played a single List A match for the county against Middlesex in the 2005 Cheltenham & Gloucester Trophy.

In his 3 career List A matches, he scored 93 runs at a batting average of 46.50, with a single half century high score of 88*.  In the field he took a single catch.  With the ball he took 5 wickets at a bowling average of 20.40, with best figures of 3/33.

He currently plays club cricket for South Northumberland Cricket Club in the North East Premier League and lives in North Gosforth.

References

External links
Stephen Humble at Cricinfo
Stephen Humble at CricketArchive

1977 births
Living people
Sportspeople from Hexham
Cricketers from Northumberland
English cricketers
Durham Cricket Board cricketers
Northumberland cricketers